Handball at the 2010 Summer Youth Olympics took place at the Suntec Singapore International Convention and Exhibition Centre in Singapore.

Medal summary

Participating teams

Boys

Girls

External links
 IHF site
 Schedule

 
2010 Summer Youth Olympics events
Youth Summer Olympics
2010